{{Infobox person
| name                    = Colette Mann
| image                   =
| caption                 = 
| birth_name              = 
| birth_date              = <ref>The Illustrated Enclyclopeadia of Australian Showbiz"</ref>
| birth_place             = Melbourne, Victoria, Australia
| occupation              = 
| years_active            = 1971–present 
| spouse                  = 
| domesticpartner         = 
| children                = 
| website                 = 
}}
Colette Mann (born 17 February 1950) is an Australian actress, singer, TV and radio presenter, choreographer and author/writer and media personality, she has been in the entertainment industry for over 50 years.

Mann appeared in two Grundy Organisation TV series, the prison drama, Prisoner, as Doreen May Anderson Burns, between 1979 and 1984, and later, in Neighbours, appearing from 2012 to February 2022, as Sheila Canning. She had previously appeared in the latter series in 1995 in an 8-week role.

She has appeared also in The Flying Doctors and Blue Heelers television series and the 2000 film The Dish. She has written two books and had a column in New Idea magazine.

Biography
Early life

Mann, born in Melbourne and trained at a local Melbourne dancing school as a child until about 19 or 20, and then went to a professional dance school and trained under Betty Pounder, a choreographer for  J.C. Williamson Theatre ltd. and obtained an arts degree in Law at University and taught at a secondary school

Television acting career

In her first high-profile role, Mann appeared in the Network Ten soap opera, Prisoner s Doreen Burns, for which she was an original cast member during the first four seasons (1979–1982). Mann resigned from the role in March 1982 to pursue other projects and her final episode (episode 304) was broadcast in August 1982. She did however make guest appearances in 1983 and 1984.

She has appeared in The Flying Doctors, MDA and Blue Heelers. In 1988, Mann portrayed the role of "Edith Fraser" in the American television movie Outback Bound, which also starred American actors Donna Mills and John Schneider. From late 1995, Mann briefly took over the role of Cheryl Stark in the soap opera Neighbours for eight weeks when Caroline Gillmer was taken ill. From February 2012, Mann joined the cast of Neighbours again as regular character Sheila Canning.

Presenter

Mann has also appeared as a presenter on the TV shows The Don Lane Show, Hey Hey It's Saturday, What's Cooking, Good Morning Australia and The Circle. She has been a fill-in presenter for Glenn Ridge on talk back radio MTR 1377. She has also appeared on Jeremy Vine Channel 5 in July 2019.

Mann was part of a three-woman troupe in the 1980s called The Mini Busettes with fellow Prisoner actresses Jane Clifton and Betty Bobbitt. They performed for three seasons at Melbourne's Le Joke comedy venue and at many Sydney league clubs.

Theatre

Mann played the role of Buttercup in Opera Australia's production of HMS Pinafore by Gilbert and Sullivan in 2005.  Mann also appeared on stage as Shirley, the battleaxe owner of Broken Hill pub, in Priscilla Queen of the Desert - the Musical in 2010.

Author 

She has also written two books, It's A Mann's World (1990) and Give Me A Break (2002) and also writes for magazine New Idea'' as a feature, talking about her family and sons.

Filmography

FILM

TELEVISION

References

External links

Australian film actresses
Australian soap opera actresses
Australian stage actresses
Australian television presenters
Living people
Actresses from Melbourne
20th-century Australian actresses
21st-century Australian actresses
Australian women television presenters
1950 births